Julien Cordonnier (born June 27, 1980 in Chartres) is a retired French professional football player.

Later career
After retiring from football at the end of 2013 due to injuries, Cordonnier was appointed sporting director of US Orléans at the end of January 2013. He was fired at the end of 2016 due to the teams poor results.

At the end of February 2018, Cordonnier was hired as a scout at AS Saint-Étienne. On 5 March 2020, he got a new position as a sporting director of the club. On 7 May 2021, Cordonnier returned to his former club, LB Châteauroux, as a chief-scout.

References

1980 births
Living people
French footballers
French expatriate footballers
Expatriate footballers in Switzerland
Ligue 2 players
Swiss Super League players
LB Châteauroux players
AS Beauvais Oise players
Neuchâtel Xamax FCS players
Clermont Foot players
US Orléans players

Association football defenders